St. Bartholomew's Church, Nottingham was a Church of England church in Nottingham on Blue Bell Hill Road between 1902 and 1971.

History

The church was built to designs started by John Loughborough Pearson and completed by his son. Frank Loughborough Pearson.

It was funded by the Incorporated Church Building Society.

It was formed as a parish in 1903, from the parishes of St. Ann's Church, Nottingham and St. Mary's Church, Nottingham.

Organ

A 2 manual pipe organ by Charles Lloyd and Co was installed in 1887.

Closure

The church was demolished in 1971.

References

Demolished buildings and structures in Nottingham
Nottingham St Bartholomew
Former Church of England church buildings
Nottingham St Bartholomew
Buildings and structures demolished in 1971